Sergiu Muth (born 24 July 1990) is a Romanian former footballer. He decided to retire from football at age 26.

References

External links

1990 births
Living people
People from Târnăveni
Romanian footballers
CS Gaz Metan Mediaș players
FC Politehnica Iași (2010) players
ASA 2013 Târgu Mureș players
Liga I players
Liga II players
Association football defenders